HMS Wagtail was a Royal Navy Cuckoo-class schooner launched in 1806 by James Lovewell at Great Yarmouth. Like many of her class and the related s, she succumbed to the perils of the sea relatively early in her career.
 
She was commissioned in 1806 under Lieutenant William Cullis. She was wrecked on 13 February 1807 at Vila Franca do Campo, São Miguel in the Azores, three hours after her sister ship  was wrecked, and near Woodcock's water-logged remains. Both vessels had been anchored in the shelter of an islet off the town when a gale came up. Because of the storm they were unable to clear the land.

Wagtails cables held until 8pm. Then her cables parted, and with waves breaking over her, Cullis ran her ashore. One man of the 18 men in her crew drowned.

Citations and references
Citations

References
 
 
 

 

1806 ships
Ships built in Norfolk
Cuckoo-class schooners
Maritime incidents in 1807
Shipwrecks of the Azores